Ectopoglossus absconditus is a sparsely-researched species of frog in the family Dendrobatidae. It is known to only be endemic to Cordillera Occidental, Cauca Department, Colombia. 
It is known from only 3 individuals discovered in 1938 and 1939. It is a poorly known species.

References

Poison dart frogs
Amphibians of Colombia
Endemic fauna of Colombia
Amphibians described in 2017